Jerome Richardson (November 15, 1920 – June 23, 2000) was an American jazz musician, tenor saxophonist, and flute player, who also played soprano sax, alto sax, baritone sax, clarinet, bass clarinet, alto flute and piccolo. He played with Charles Mingus, Lionel Hampton, Billy Eckstine, The Thad Jones/Mel Lewis Orchestra, Kenny Burrell, and later with Earl Hines' small band.

Richardson was born in Oakland, California, and died in Englewood, New Jersey, of heart failure at the age of 79.

Discography

As leader
 Midnight Oil (New Jazz, 1959) 
 Roamin' with Richardson (New Jazz, 1959) 
 Going to the Movies (United Artists, 1962)
 Groove Merchant (Verve, 1967) 
 Jazz Station Runaway (TCB, 1997)

As sideman

 1955: Oscar Pettiford: Another One (Bethlehem)
 1955: Kenny Clarke: Bohemia After Dark (Savoy)
 1955: Ernie Wilkins: Flutes & Reeds (Savoy) with Frank Wess
 1955: Nat Adderley: That's Nat (Savoy)
 1955: Sarah Vaughan: In the Land of Hi-Fi (Mercury)
 1955: Hank Jones: Bluebird (Savoy)
 1955: Jimmy Cleveland: Introducing Jimmy Cleveland and His All Stars (EmArcy)
 1956: Cannonball Adderley: In the Land of Hi-Fi with Julian Cannonball Adderley
 1956: Kenny Burrell: All Night Long (Prestige)
 1956: Oscar Pettiford: The Oscar Pettiford Orchestra in Hi-Fi (ABC-Paramount)
 1957: Quincy Jones: This Is How I Feel About Jazz (ABC-Paramount)
 1957: Phineas Newborn, Jr.: Phineas Newborn, Jr. Plays Harold Arlen's Music from Jamaica (RCA Victor)
 1957: Oscar Pettiford: The Oscar Pettiford Orchestra in Hi-Fi Volume Two (ABC-Paramount)
 1957: The Three Playmates - The Three Playmates with George Barrow, Jerome Richardson, Budd Johnson, Sam Price, Kenny Burrell, Joe Benjamin, Bobby Donaldson, Ernie Wilkins (arranger) (Savoy Records, 1957)
 1958: Gene Ammons: The Big Sound (Prestige), Groove Blues (Prestige)
 1958: Eddie "Lockjaw" Davis: The Eddie "Lockjaw" Davis Cookbook (Prestige), The Eddie "Lockjaw" Davis Cookbook, Vol. 2 (Prestige), The Eddie "Lockjaw" Davis Cookbook Volume 3 (Prestige), Smokin' (Prestige)
 1958: Betty Carter: I Can't Help It
 1958: Abbey Lincoln: It's Magic (Riverside)
 1958: Ray Brown: This Is Ray Brown
 1958: Jimmy Cleveland: A Map of Jimmy Cleveland (Mercury)
 1958: Helen Merrill: You've Got a Date with the Blues (MetroJazz)
 1959: Tiny Grimes: Tiny in Swingville (Swingville) 
 1959: Jimmy Cleveland: Rhythm Crazy (EmArcy)
 1959: Dinah Washington: What a Diff'rence a Day Makes!
 1959: Joe Wilder: The Pretty Sound (Columbia)
 1959: Ruth Brown: Miss Rhythm (Atlantic)
 1959: Ahmed Abdul-Malik: East Meets West (RCA Victor)
 1959: Quincy Jones: The Birth of a Band!, The Great Wide World of Quincy Jones (Mercury)
 1959: Billy Taylor: Billy Taylor with Four Flutes (Riverside)
 1960: Randy Weston:  Uhuru Afrika (Roulette)
 1960: Quincy Jones: I Dig Dancers (Mercury)
 1960: Eddie "Lockjaw" Davis:  Trane Whistle (Prestige)
 1961: Benny Golson: Pop + Jazz = Swing (Audio Fidelity)
 1961: Etta Jones: So Warm (Prestige)
 1961: Billy Taylor: Kwamina (Mercury)
 1961: Cannonball Adderley: African Waltz (Riverside)
 1962: Junior Mance: The Soul of Hollywood (Jazzland)
 1962: Blue Mitchell: A Sure Thing
 1962: Milt Jackson: Big Bags 
 1962: Harry Belafonte: Midnight Special
 1962: Quincy Jones: Big Band Bossa Nova
 1962: Quincy Jones: The Quintessence
 1962: Charles Mingus: The Complete Town Hall Concert (Blue Note)
 1962: Etta Jones: Love Shout (Prestige), Hollar! (Prestige)
 1963: Buddy Emmons: Steel Guitar Jazz (Mercury)
 1963: Lalo Schifrin and Bob Brookmeyer: Samba Para Dos (Verve)
 1963: Charles Mingus: Mingus Mingus Mingus Mingus Mingus (Impulse!)
 1963: Charles Mingus: The Black Saint and the Sinner Lady (Impulse!)
 1964: Lalo Schifrin: New Fantasy (Verve)
 1964: Cal Tjader: Warm Wave (Verve)
 1964: Quincy Jones: Quincy Jones Explores the Music of Henry Mancini, Golden Boy (Mercury)
 1964: J. J. Johnson: J.J.! (RCA Victor)
 1965: Milt Jackson: Ray Brown / Milt Jackson with Ray Brown (Verve)
 1965: Quincy Jones: Quincy Plays for Pussycats (Mercury)
 1965: Lalo Schifrin: Once a Thief and Other Themes (Verve)
 1965: J. J. Johnson: Goodies (RCA Victor)
 1965: Jimmy Smith: Monster (Verve)
 1965: Sonny Stitt: Broadway Soul (Colpix)
 1965: Shirley Scott: Latin Shadows (Impulse!)
 1965: J. J. Johnson: Broadway Express (RCA Victor)
 1966: Oliver Nelson: Oliver Nelson Plays Michelle (Impulse!)
 1966: Cal Tjader: Soul Burst (Verve)
 1966: Oliver Nelson: Happenings with Hank Jones (Impulse!)
 1966: Shirley Scott: Roll 'Em: Shirley Scott Plays the Big Bands (Impulse!)
 1966: Les McCann: Les McCann Plays the Hits (Limelight)
 1966: Jimmy Smith: Got My Mojo Workin', Hoochie Coochie Man (Verve)
 1966: Jimmy McGriff: The Big Band (Solid State) 
 1966: Manny Albam: The Soul of the City (Solid State)
 1966: Chico Hamilton: The Further Adventures of El Chico (Impulse!)
 1966: Oliver Nelson: Encyclopedia of Jazz (Verve)
 1966: Oliver Nelson: The Sound of Feeling (Verve)
 1966: Clark Terry: Mumbles (Mainstream)
 1966: J. J. Johnson: The Total J.J. Johnson (RCA Victor) 
 1966: Johnny Hodges: Blue Notes (Verve)
 1967: Johnny Hodges: Don't Sleep in the Subway (Verve)
 1967: Sylvia Syms: For Once in My Life (Prestige)
 1967: Jimmy McGriff: A Bag Full of Blues (Solid State)
 1967: Kai Winding: Penny Lane & Time (Verve)
 1967: Antônio Carlos Jobim: Wave (A&M/CTI)
 1968: Stan Getz: What the World Needs Now: Stan Getz Plays Burt Bacharach and Hal David (Verve, 1968)
 1968: Earl Coleman: Manhattan Serenade
 1968: David "Fathead" Newman: Bigger & Better (Atlantic)
 1968: Stanley Turrentine: Always Something There
 1968: Nat Adderley: You, Baby
 1968: Kenny Burrell: Blues - The Common Ground (Verve)
 1968: Sonny Stitt: Parallel-a-Stitt (Roulette)
 1968: Nat Adderley: Calling Out Loud
 1969: Dizzy Gillespie: It's My Way (Solid State)
 1969: Sonny Stitt: Come Hither (Solid State)
 1969: Walter Wanderley: Moondreams (A&M/CTI)
 1969: Dizzy Gillespie: Cornucopia (Solid State) 
 1969: Kenny Burrell: Night Song (Verve)
 1969: Roy Ayers: Daddy Bug (Atlantic)
 1969: Milton Nascimento - Courage (A&M/CTI)
 1969: George Benson - Tell It Like It Is (A&M/CTI)
 1969: George Benson: ‘’The Other Side of Abbey Road (A&M/CTI)
 1969: Herbie Hancock: The Prisoner (Blue Note)
 1969: Phil Woods: Round Trip (Verve)
 1970: Mose Allison: Hello There, Universe (Atlantic)
 1970: Quincy Jones: Gula Matari (A&M)
 1970: Johnny Hodges: 3 Shades of Blue (Flying Dutchman)
 1970: Leon Thomas: The Leon Thomas Album (Flying Dutchman)
 1970: The Thad Jones / Mel Lewis Orchestra: Consummation
 1970: Billy Butler: Yesterday, Today & Tomorrow (Prestige)
 1971: Stanley Turrentine: Salt Song (CTI)
 1971: Gene Ammons:  Free Again (Prestige)
 1971: Reuben Wilson: Set Us Free
 1972: Quincy Jones: The Hot Rock OST (Prophesy)
 1972: Steely Dan: Can't Buy a Thrill
 1973: Lalo Schifrin: Enter the Dragon (soundtrack) (Warner Bros.)
 1973: Kenny Burrell: Both Feet on the Ground (Fantasy)
 1973: Bee Gees: Life in a Tin Can
 1974: Kenny Burrell: Up the Street, 'Round the Corner, Down the Block (Fantasy)
 1974: Moacir Santos: Saudade (Blue Note)
 1975: Kenny Burrell:  Ellington Is Forever (Fantasy)
 1975: Horace Silver: Silver 'n Brass (Blue Note)
 1975: Oliver Nelson: Skull Session (RCA/Flying Dutchman), Stolen Moments (East Wind)
 1975: Richard "Groove" Holmes: Six Million Dollar Man,  (RCA/Flying Dutchman)
 1975: Moacir Santos: Carnival of the Spirits
 1975: Kenny Burrell: Sky Street, Ellington Is Forever Volume Two (Fantasy)
 1975: Gino Vannelli: Storm at Sunup (A&M)
 1976: Bobby Bland, B. B. King - Bobby Bland and B. B. King Together Again...Live
 1976: Wade Marcus: Metamorphosis
 1976: Carmen McRae: Can't Hide Love
 1976: Zoot Sims: Hawthorne Nights (Pablo)
 1976: Milt Jackson: Feelings (Pablo)
 1976: Lee Ritenour: First Course
 1977: Dizzy Gillespie: Free Ride (Pablo)
 1977: Benny Golson: Killer Joe (Columbia)
 1977: Quincy Jones: Roots (A&M)
 1979: The Crusaders: Street Life
 1979: Earth, Wind & Fire: I Am
 1980: Kenny Burrell: Heritage (AudioSource)
 1981: Gerald Wilson: Lomelin (Discovery)
 1990: Joey DeFrancesco: Where Were You? (Columbia)
 1991: Clifford Jordan: Down Through the Years (Milestone)
 1992: Jimmy Heath: Little Man Big Band (Verve)

References

External links
Obituary – JazzHouse.org

1920 births
2000 deaths
Musicians from Oakland, California
American jazz saxophonists
American male saxophonists
American jazz flautists
Verve Records artists
20th-century British musicians
20th-century American saxophonists
Jazz musicians from California
20th-century American male musicians
American male jazz musicians
The Thad Jones/Mel Lewis Orchestra members
Orchestra U.S.A. members
20th-century flautists